Arthur Burdett (died December 1796) was an Irish politician.

Burdett was the Member of Parliament for Harristown in the Irish House of Commons between 1790 and his death in 1796.

References

Year of birth unknown
1796 deaths
Irish MPs 1790–1797
Members of the Parliament of Ireland (pre-1801) for County Kildare constituencies